Scrabble 2007 Edition is a puzzle video game for the Nintendo DS and Windows. It was published by Ubisoft and developed by Wizarbox. It was released on  September 7, 2007. The rules are the same as the board game of the same name, involving placing letters on a grid to score points in a crossword fashion.

Controversy
The Nintendo DS version made worldwide news in September, 2007 and December, 2008 when parents became upset upon finding the game's artificial intelligence player using coarse language ("shit", "lesbo", "tits" and "fucker").
This led to the re-rating of the game to be 12+ instead of 3+ under PEGI and "Everyone" ages 10+ under ESRB.

References

External links
 Official publisher page for Scrabble 2007 Edition

2007 video games
Nintendo DS games
Puzzle video games
Scrabble software
Video games developed in France
Windows games
Ubisoft games
Wizarbox games